Aglossodes mocquerysi is a species of snout moth in the genus Aglossodes. It was described by Patrice J.A. Leraut in 2009 and is known from Sierra Leone.

References

Moths described in 2009
Pyralinae
Moths of Africa